Ruff House is the debut EP by hard rock/heavy metal band Child's Play, released in 1986 through Rampant Records. It was produced by J. J. Micelli, Kim Fowley and Paul Lani.

Track listing

Personnel

Child'ƨ Play
Larry Hinshaw - lead vocals
Brian Jack - guitars
Nicky Kay - guitars
Phil Wiser - bass
John Allen - drums

Production
Paul Lani – producers, engineers, mixing
Kim Fowley – mastering at Hollywood, California

References

External links
 Official Site (archive)

Child's Play (band) albums
1986 debut EPs
Rampant Records albums
Albums produced by J. J. Micelli
Albums produced by Paul Lani
Albums produced by Kim Fowley